Winning is a 1969 American Panavision action drama sports film directed by James Goldstone and starring Paul Newman, Joanne Woodward and Robert Wagner. The film is about a race car driver who aspires to win the Indianapolis 500. A number of race car drivers and people associated with racing appear in the film, including Bobby Unser, Tony Hulman, Bobby Grim, Dan Gurney, Roger McCluskey, and Bruce Walkup.

Plot
Professional race car driver Frank Capua meets divorcee Elora. After a whirlwind romance they are married. Charley, Elora's teenage son by her first husband, becomes very close to Frank, and helps him prepare his cars for his races. But Frank is so dedicated to his career that he neglects his wife, who has an affair with Frank's main rival on the race track, Luther Erding. Frank finds them in bed together and storms out. The couple separate, but Frank still sees Charley regularly. Frank's bitterness fuels his dedication to his work, and he becomes a much more aggressive driver. At the Indianapolis 500, Elora and Charley watch while Frank drives the race of his life and wins. After winning, Frank attends a victory party. He is uninterested when attractive women throw themselves at him, and he slips away. Luther finds Frank and apologizes to him for the affair, but Frank punches him. Frank visits Elora and tells her he wants to start again. Elora is unsure. The film ends with a freeze-frame as the two look uncertainly at each other.

Cast
 Paul Newman as Frank Capua
 Joanne Woodward as Elora Capua
 Robert Wagner as Luther Lou Erding
 Richard Thomas as Charley Capua
 David Sheiner as Leo Crawford
 Clu Gulager as Larry the Mechanic
 Barry Ford as Bottineau
 Karen Arthur as Miss Dairy Queen
 Bobby Unser as himself
 Tony Hulman as himself

Production

During preparation for this film, Newman was trained for the motorsport by drivers Bob Sharp and Lake Underwood, at a race track high performance driving school—which sparked Newman's enthusiasm for the sport and led to his participation as a competitor in sports car racing during the remainder of his life. He would eventually launch the much successful Newman/Haas Racing with his longtime racing competitor and friend Carl Haas, winning more than 100 races and 8 Driver's Championships in IndyCar Series, although notably the team never won the 500.

The film includes footage taken at the Indianapolis Motor Speedway, the legendary 2.5 mile track. Most of the footage is from the 1968 race. The accident during the first green flag is from the 1966 race.

Reception

Box office
The film earned an estimated $6.2 million in rentals in North America. It was the 16th most popular film at the US box office that year.

Critical
Quentin Tarantino, when asked about his favorite race car films, was not a fan of Winning. "I’d rather saw my fingers off than sit through that again," he said.

Soundtrack
The film score was by Dave Grusin, and the original soundtrack album was issued on Decca Records.  The opening moments of the film's theme, "500 Miles," were used by WEWS-TV in Cleveland in the 1970s and 1980s as the theme for their Million Dollar Movie. The movie's opening theme was used in the early 1970s in TVG's US syndicated college basketball network's telecasts.

See also
 List of American films of 1969

References

External links

 
 
 
 

1969 drama films
1969 films
1960s American films
1960s English-language films
1960s sports drama films
American sports drama films
American auto racing films
Films scored by Dave Grusin
Films directed by James Goldstone
Films produced by John Foreman (producer)
Films set in Indianapolis
Indianapolis 500
Universal Pictures films
Films shot in Indianapolis